Khachatur Abovian Armenian State Pedagogical University   (ASPU), is a state university and higher education institution based in Yerevan, the capital of Armenia. Founded in 1922, the university is specialized in pedagogy and the preparation of teaching staff.

Named after the 19th-century Armenian writer Khachatur Abovian, the current rector of the university is professor Srbuhi Gevorgyan.

History 
The Armenian State Pedagogical University was founded on November 7, 1922, and in 1948, it was named after Khachatur Abovian, an Armenian educator, poet and an advocate of modernization.

The newly established university had only a pedagogical faculty with preschool, school and extracurricular specialties. Classes started on November 27, in the building of the former Hripsimian gymnasium.

The university has 10 faculties and more than 50 chairs. Since the 2004-2005 academic year, the university has been implementing three-level (bachelor's, master's, postgraduate) education. The study period is 4 years for the bachelor's degree and 2 years for the master's degree. The university has a basic school as well as a high school-college in the center of Yerevan.

ASPU Museum 
The Museum of Armenian State Pedagogical University after Khachatur Abovyan was founded on May 11, 2004, and is under the administrative subordination of the University Council headed by the Rector. The current exhibition was opened on November 19, 2012, on the occasion of the 90th anniversary of the University. The Museum pays special attention to visitors with special educational needs.

ASPU Trade Union 
The ASPU Trade Organization or Trade Union is regulated by the Law on Public Organizations of the Republic of Armenia, the RA Labour Code, the ASPU Statute, the ASPU Trade Organization Charter and collective contracts. The union aims to solve the legal and social issues of the employees.

Faculties

As of 2017, the university is home to 10 faculties:
Faculty of Philology
Faculty of History and Social Science
Faculty of Preschool Education
Faculty of Biology, Chemistry and Geography
Faculty of Education Psychology and Sociology
Faculty of Foreign Languages
Faculty of Mathematics, Physics and Informatics
Faculty of Art Education
Faculty of Special and Inclusive Education
Faculty of Culture

University Chairs 

 Chair of Pedagogy
 Chair of Sports and Chess
 Chair of First Aid, Emergency and Civil Protection
 Chair of Economics and Management
 Chair of Philosophy and Logic named after Academician Georg Brutian
 Chair of Ecology and Sustainable Development

Specializations 

 Preschool Pedagogy and Methodology
 Social Pedagogy
 Elementary Pedagogy and Methodology
 Surdopedagogy
 Typhlo-Pedagogy
 Oligophrenic pedagogy
 Logopaedics [Speech Therapy]
 Armenian Language and Literature
 Physics
 Technologies and Entrepreneurships
 Informatics
 Mathematics
 Chemistry
 Biology
 Geography
 History
 Fine Arts
 Musical Education
 Choreography
 English Language and Literature
 German Language and Literature
 Russian Language and Literature
 Spanish Language and Literature
 Social Studies
 Artistic Photography
 Camera Operation
 Clothing Design
 Decorative and Applied Arts
 Instrumental Performance
 Directing
 Theory, History and Management of Arts
 Psychology
 Sociology
 Culturology
 Museology and Protection of Historical Monuments
 Journalism
 Library and Information Resources
 Environmental Studies
 Management (by industry)
 Social Work

International Co-operation Unit
The International Co-operation Unit co-ordinates the implementation of strategic objectives of the university; co-operates with foreign higher education institutions and university structural divisions; develops co-operation projects; and monitors their implementation.

The university co-operates with the British Council, TEMPUS national agency, Rossotrudnichestvo (Russia), as well as with projects financed by the European Committee and other donor organizations.

Notable alumni
Movses Gorgisyan, National hero of the Republic of Armenia.
Zhirayr Ananyan, playwright.
Hovhannes Galstyan, film director, writer and producer.
Ara Gevorgyan, musician, composer and producer.
Stella Grigoryan, artist.
Hasmik Harutyunyan, folk singer.
Aramais Sahakyan, poet and translator.
Arthur Sarkissian, artist and painter.
Davit Gharibyan, model, actor, producer and showman.
Seyran Shahsuvaryan, Press-Secretary of the Ministry of Defence of the Republic of Armenia.
Taguhi Tovmasyan, politician.
Arpine Mikaeli Ter-Petrosyan, (artistic name Arpi Alto), singer, songwriter, musician and record producer.

Notable staff
Ada Gabrielyan - archaic art

References

External links
Official website
ASPU Basic School
ASPU High School

 
Universities and institutes established in the Soviet Union
Educational institutions established in 1922
1922 establishments in Armenia